The  is a regional rail line in Aomori Prefecture, Japan that is operated by the Aoimori Railway Company. It connects the terminal station of the Iwate Galaxy Railway Line, Metoki Station, in the town of Sannohe to Aomori Station, the terminus of several rail lines in the city of Aomori. Though local passenger services are run on the line by the Aoimori Railway Company, the East Japan Railway Company continues to operate limited services, such as the sightseeing train Resort Asunaro, along the line, and the Japan Freight Railway Company (which owns a minority stake on the Aoimori Railway Company) transports freight along the line.

History

The predecessor to the Aoimori Railway Line was completed as the – portion of the Nippon Railway on 1 September 1891. When the Nippon Railway was nationalized on 1 November 1906, it became part of the Japanese National Railways (JNR) system and was designated part of the Tōhoku Main Line on 12 October 1909. With the privatization and dissolution of JNR on 1 April 1987, the line came under the control of the East Japan Railway Company (JR East). 

On 1 December 2002, with the opening of the Tōhoku Shinkansen, the portion of the Tōhoku Main Line located in Iwate Prefecture became the Iwate Galaxy Railway Line, and the portion in Aomori Prefecture from the Iwate border to Hachinohe Station became the Aoimori Railway Line.

There have been a few new developments along the line since its transfer to the Aoimori Railway Company. Tsutsui Station, near Aomori High School, was opened on 15 March 2014. Two-car Aoimori 703 series sets began operations on the line on the same day to handle the increased loads presented by the opening of Tsutsui Station.

Organization
The Aoimori Railway Line is operated by the Aoimori Railway Company, a "third-sector" publicly and privately owned company. The railway facilities and tracks are owned by the prefectural government of Aomori as a "Category 3 Railway Business" under the Railway Business Act of Japan. The Aoimori Railway Company leases these facilities from the prefectural government and is responsible for operation of passenger trains on the tracks.

The Aoimori Railway Line is designated as the rail line between Aomori and Metoki stations that was formerly the northernmost section of the Tōhoku Main Line. Trains operated by the Aoimori Railway Company primarily operate between Aomori and Hachinohe stations; however, some of the railway's trains continue south beyond Hachinohe to Sannohe Station, with fewer continuing south to Morioka Station. Some of the trains that run along the railway between Hachinohe and Metoki Station are carried by the rolling stock of the Iwate Galaxy Railway Company, the operator of the former Tōhoku Main Line between Metoki and Morioka stations.

Japan Freight Railway Company (JR Freight), the nationwide freight train operator, continues to use the line for freight services. For maintenance work, the line relies on the services of the Hachinohe Rinkai Railway Company.

Station list

Rolling stock and equipment
 Aoimori 701 series 2-car EMUs x9
 Aoimori 703 series 2-car EMUs x2

The Aoimori Railway operates a fleet of 701 series two-car electric multiple units (EMUs). One set was built from new in September 2002, while eight more were transferred from JR East.

Two new two-car Aoimori 703 series EMUs were delivered in November 2013 and introduced from the start of the 15 March 2014 timetable revision.

Future plans

The railway has been negotiating with the city of Aomori since December 2015 on a proposal to open a new station between Tsutsui Station and Aomori Station near the point at which the railway passes under Japan National Route 103. The station would be part of a sports arena development for the 2025 National Sports Festival of Japan to be held in Aomori. The neighborhood the station would serve is a primarily residential area, but it would also provide access to some busy shopping centers within walking distance to the station. As of January 2021, no final decision has been made regarding the construction of the new station.

See also
List of railway lines in Japan

References

 Harris, Ken and Clarke, Jackie. Jane's World Railways 2008-2009. Jane's Information Group (2008).

External links

 

 
Aoimori Railway Line
Rail transport in Aomori Prefecture
1067 mm gauge railways in Japan
Railway lines opened in 1891
Japanese third-sector railway lines